Seeds of Destruction may refer to:
 Seeds of Destruction (book), a book written by F. William Engdahl
 "Seeds of Destruction" (The Outer Limits), an episode
 EverQuest: Seeds of Destruction, an EverQuest expansion title